John Bottlesham was a medieval Bishop of Rochester.

Prior to Bottlesham's appointment as bishop, he was Master of Peterhouse, Cambridge, beginning his term on 27 August 1397 and resigning in 1400. He was nominated as bishop on 9 April 1400 and consecrated on 4 July 1400. He died on 17 April 1404.

Citations

References

 
 

Bishops of Rochester
15th-century English Roman Catholic bishops
1404 deaths
Masters of Peterhouse, Cambridge
Year of birth unknown